The 2002 ICC Champions Trophy was a cricket tournament that was held in Sri Lanka in 2002. It was the third edition of the ICC Champions Trophy – the first two having been known as the ICC Knock Out Tournaments. The tournament was due to be held in India, but was switched to Sri Lanka when an exemption from tax in India was not granted. Fifteen matches were to be played in the tournament including two semi-finals and a final match.[1] All the matches were played in Colombo at two grounds: R. Premadasa Stadium and Sinhalese Sports Club Ground. It was the first time that the teams of all International Cricket Council (ICC) member nations visited Sri Lanka to participate in a cricket tournament.[1]

Twelve teams competed: the 10 Test-playing nations plus Kenya who has full One Day International (ODI) status and the 2001 ICC Trophy winners the Netherlands. The teams were split into four pools of three teams each. Each team played the other two teams in its pool once, and the four teams that lead in each pool proceeded to the Semi-finals.[2][3] Australia lost to Sri Lanka in the first semi-final whereas India defeated South Africa in the second semi final. The final between India and Sri Lanka was washed out twice, to leave no result.[4] Virender Sehwag was the highest run-scorer of the tournament and Muttiah Muralitharan was the highest wicket-taker.

This is a list of squads that participated in the 2002 ICC Champions Trophy.

Squads

Ricky Ponting (Captain)
Adam Gilchrist (Vice-captain)
Michael Bevan
Jason Gillespie
Nathan Hauritz
Matthew Hayden
Brett Lee
Darren Lehmann
Jimmy Maher
Damien Martyn
Glenn McGrath
Shane Warne
Shane Watson

Source

Khaled Mashud (Captain)
Al Sahariar
Alok Kapali
Fahim Muntasir
Habibul Bashar
Javed Omar
Khaled Mahmud
Manjural Islam
Mazharul Haque
Mohammad Ashraful
Mohammad Rafique
Talha Jubair
Tapash Baisya
Tushar Imran

Source

Nasser Hussain (Captain)
Ian Blackwell
Andrew Caddick
Rikki Clarke
Dominic Cork
Ashley Giles
Matthew Hoggard
Ronnie Irani
James Kirtley
Nick Knight
Owais Shah
Jeremy Snape
Alec Stewart (Wicketkeeper)
Marcus Trescothick

Source

Sourav Ganguly (Captain)
Rahul Dravid (Vice-Captain)
Sachin Tendulkar
Virender Sehwag
Dinesh Mongia
Mohammad Kaif
Anil Kumble
Harbhajan Singh
Zaheer Khan
Ajit Agarkar
Yuvraj Singh
Jai Prakash Yadav
Ashish Nehra
VVS Laxman
Javagal Srinath

Source

Steve Tikolo (Captain)
Thomas Odoyo (Vice-captain)
Joseph Angara
Jimmy Kamande
Brijal Patel
Collins Obuya
David Obuya
Maurice Odumbe
Peter Ongondo
Lameck Onyango
Kennedy Otieno
Ravindu Shah
Tony Suji
Martin Suji

Source

Roland Lefebvre (Captain)
Luuk van Troost
Daan van Bunge
Jacob-Jan Esmeijer
Victor Grandia
Feiko Kloppenburg
Tim de Leede
Hendrik-Jan Mol
Robert van Oosterom
Adeel Raja
Edgar Schiferli
Reinout Scholte
Nick Statham
Bas Zuiderent

Source

Stephen Fleming (Captain)
Nathan Astle
Shane Bond
Chris Harris
Paul Hitchcock
Kyle Mills
Chris Nevin
Jacob Oram
Mathew Sinclair
Scott Styris
Glen Sulzberger
Daryl Tuffey
Daniel Vettori
Lou Vincent

Source

Waqar Younis (Captain)
Inzamam-ul-Haq (Vice-Captain)
Abdul Razzaq
Imran Nazir
Misbah-ul-Haq
Mohammad Sami
Rashid Latif (Wicket-keeper)
Saeed Anwar
Shahid Afridi
Shoaib Akhtar
Shoaib Malik
Wasim Akram
Younis Khan
Yousuf Youhana

Source

Shaun Pollock (Captain)
Dale Benkenstein
Nicky Boje
Mark Boucher
Alan Dawson
Boeta Dippenaar
Allan Donald
Herschelle Gibbs
Jacques Kallis
Lance Klusener
Makhaya Ntini
Justin Ontong
Jonty Rhodes
Graeme Smith
Robin Peterson

Source

Sanath Jayasuriya (Captain)
Russel Arnold
Marvan Atapattu
Mahela Jayawardene
Aravinda de Silva
Upul Chandana
Kumar Sangakkara
Kumar Dharmasena
Tillakaratne Dilshan
Chaminda Vaas
Hasantha Fernando
Dilhara Fernando
Muttiah Muralitharan
Pulasthi Gunaratne

Source

Carl Hooper (Captain)
Shivnarine Chanderpaul
Pedro Collins
Corey Collymore
Cameron Cuffy – withdrawn 4 September
Mervyn Dillon
Vasbert Drakes
Chris Gayle
Ryan Hinds
Wavell Hinds
Ridley Jacobs
Brian Lara
Runako Morton
Mahendra Nagamootoo
Ramnaresh Sarwan

Source

Heath Streak (Captain)
Alistair Campbell
Stuart Carlisle
Dion Ebrahim
Sean Ervine
Andy Flower
Grant Flower
Travis Friend
Douglas Hondo
Dougie Marillier
Mpumelelo Mbangwa
Raymond Price
Tatenda Taibu
Guy Whittall

Source

References

2002
2002 in Sri Lankan cricket
International cricket competitions in 2002
Cricket, ICC Champions Trophy, 2002, Squads
Squads